= Mochianwala Mohra =

- Town
- Location within Pakistan
- Coordinates: 33.24°N 73.25°E
- Country: Pakistan
- Province: (Islamabad Capital Territory) Islamabad C.T
- Elevation: 522 m (1,713 ft)
- Time zone: UTC+5 (PST)

Mochianwala Mohra is a town in the Islamabad Capital Territory of Pakistan. It is located at 33° 24' 35N 73° 25' 35E with an altitude of 522 metres (1715 feet).
